Brian Douglas Rogers (born July 25, 1950, in Blue Hill, Maine) was the 6th chancellor of the University of Alaska Fairbanks from 2009 - 2015.

Life
He graduated from Harvard University’s John F. Kennedy School of Government, with a master's degree in public administration.
He was a free-lance journalist, a legislative aide, a member of the Alaska House of Representatives from 1979 to 1983, a vice president of finance for the University of Alaska statewide system and a partner and chief financial officer in the consulting firm Information Insights, from 1996 to 2008.
He chaired the State of Alaska Long-Range Planning Commission from 1995 to 1996. 
He was appointed to the Alaska Natural Gas Development Authority, by Governor Sarah Palin.
He is a director of Alaska Communications Systems Group.

University of Alaska Fairbanks
University of Alaska President Mark Hamilton named Brian Rogers permanent chancellor of UAF in May 2009. Rogers had served as interim chancellor since July 2008. A former UAF student, he attended Trinity College and Brown University before receiving his master's degree in public administration from Harvard. Rogers is married to UAF alumna Sherry Modrow. They have two grown sons, both UAF graduates. Rogers is a member of numerous community organizations, including the Greater Fairbanks Chamber of Commerce, the Fairbanks Downtown Rotary. Rogers announced in April 2015 his intention to step down from the position in September 2015.

References

External links
 Brian Rogers at 100 Years of Alaska's Legislature

1950 births
American academic administrators
Businesspeople from Fairbanks, Alaska
Harvard Kennedy School alumni
Living people
Members of the Alaska House of Representatives
People from Blue Hill, Maine
Politicians from Fairbanks, Alaska
Leaders of the University of Alaska Fairbanks
University of Alaska regents